Tearing Down the Walls is the fourth studio album by the Swedish hard rock group H.E.A.T and only album without the guitarist Dave Dalone. The album was released on 26 March 2014 by the record company Gain/Sony Music. The first single off the album is "A Shot at Redemption", released on 12 February 2014. The second is 'Mannequin Show'.

Track listing

Personnel
 Erik Grönwall – vocals
 Eric Rivers – guitars
 Jona Tee – keyboards
 Jimmy Jay – bass
 Don Crash – drums

Charts

References

2014 albums
Albums produced by Tobias Lindell
H.E.A.T albums